Georg Reichwein, Jr. (1630–1710) was a military government official. He was the son of general major Georg Reichwein, Sr., who immigrated to Denmark-Norway from Hesse in 1628. 

In 1658 he became captain in charge of the Sør-Gudbrandsdalske company. In a letter written in 1664 we find he lived at Jørstad farm in Fåberg. His father was raised to a peerage in 1655, and he would have been foremost in rank at Fåberg in his time. He bought both Nordre Jørstad and Søndre Jørstad farms in 1672. 

Reichwein was promoted to Major in 1675, and as Lieutenant Colonel in 1682 he was commander of Kongsvinger Fortress. He remained at Kongsvinger and became a Colonel in 1689. He lived at Vingnes in 1695, where he is recorded as married to his second wife, Catharina Sverdrup. He died in 1710. His son Lorentz Reichwein became a military officer and county governor.

References 

1630 births
1710 deaths
Danish military personnel
Norwegian Army personnel
Norwegian people of German descent
County governors of Norway